Giesen is a village and a municipality in the district of Hildesheim, in Lower Saxony, Germany. It is situated approximately 6 km northwest of Hildesheim, and 22 km southeast of Hanover.

The municipality includes five villages:
 Ahrbergen (pop. 2,219)
 Emmerke (pop. 1,684)
 Giesen (pop. 3,401)
 Groß Förste (pop. 795) 
 Hasede (pop. 1,606)

Gallery

Personalities 
Sons and daughters of the community:
 Hermann Schnipkoweit (born 1928), politician (CDU)

Personalities associated with this community:
 Michael Weiner (born 1969), football referee, lives in the district of Hasede

References

External links

Hildesheim (district)